Fairfield County Bank, is a full-service community bank and insurance provider serving customers in Fairfield County, Connecticut. The bank is headquartered in Ridgefield, Connecticut and was founded in 1871.

History
In 1871, Ridgefield Savings Bank opened its first office at Old Hundred now the Aldrich Museum. The bank was a part of the Bailey & Gage store. In 1874, Fairfield County Savings Bank opened its first office on Wall Street, Norwalk. In 2004, the two banks, Ridgefield Bank and Fairfield County Savings Bank, come together as Fairfield County Savings Bank.  The bank's insurance arm is currently licensed to operate in 32 States.

Notes

External links
 Official website

Banks based in Connecticut
Banks established in 1871
Mutual savings banks in the United States
Companies based in Fairfield County, Connecticut
1871 establishments in Connecticut